Cedric "Ced-Gee" Miller (born 1963) is an American hip hop producer and rapper from the Bronx, New York. He is best known as a member of Ultramagnetic MCs. He received special thanks for his production on Boogie Down Productions' Criminal Minded, and he produced Tim Dog's "Fuck Compton". He has also worked alongside Antoinette, Bill Cosby, Blak Prophetz, Doug E. Fresh, Jeff Redd, Paperboy, Spaceman Patterson, Sybil, and Treacherous Three.

Ced-Gee has held positions as an A&R man and staff producer, a producer for Next Plateau Records, Wild Pitch Records, Mercury Records, Ruffhouse Records, Roadrunner Records, and Uptown Records.

Discography

Solo
Studio albums
 2004 – The Underground Show EP (CD) (The Factshen)
Singles
 1998 – "Long Gev/The Impossible" (12") (3-2-1 Records)

With Ultramagnetic MCs

 1988 – Critical Beatdown
 1992 – Funk Your Head Up
 1993 – The Four Horsemen
 2007 – The Best Kept Secret

Notable production credits and guest appearances 
Albums
 1987 - Criminal Minded by Boogie Down Productions
 1993 - Idol the Bloodsport by MF911
 2009 - Bill Cosby Presents the Cosnarati: State of Emergency by Bill Cosby
Songs
 1989 - "Bad Beats Suite" by Sybil from Sybil
 1991 - "Fuck Compton", "You Ain't Shit", "Can't Fuck Around", "Goin' Wild in the Penile" and "Patriotic Pimp" by Tim Dog from Penicillin on Wax
 1994 - "Ain't Nothing Changed" by Treacherous Three from Old School Flava
 2005 - "Intro" and "The Illest" by Blak Prophetz from 2nd Coming
 2009 - "Magnetic Junkadelic" by Kool Keith from Tashan Dorrsett

References

External links 

Living people
African-American male rappers
African-American record producers
Rappers from the Bronx
1963 births
21st-century American rappers
21st-century American male musicians
21st-century African-American musicians
20th-century African-American people